FPT may refer to:

 Female pipe tapered; see National pipe thread
 F/P/T, an acronym used by Canadian governments to designate a joint Special Advisory Committee of Federal/Provincial/Territorial civil servants 
 Fiat Powertrain Technologies, an Italian automotive company
 Fixed-parameter tractability, in computer science
 Florida Playwrights' Theatre, an erstwhile theatre group in Hollywood, Florida, United States
 Forced perfect termination, in electronics
 FPT Group, a Vietnamese IT company
 FPT Software, a Vietnamese software company
 FPT Industries, an American aerospace engineering company
 FPT University, in Vietnam
 Full Pressure Turbo, in Saab automobiles
 Portuguese Tennis Federation